Anthony A. "Tony" Wager (24 June 1932 – 23 December 1990) was an English actor and television writer. Wager is best known for portraying the role of the young "Pip" in David Lean's 1946 film of Great Expectations.

Early life and career
Wager was born in Willesden, north London and grew up in Mill Hill and Hendon. Wager's father was a plumber and decorator. He studied at Christ's College, Finchley. In 1945, Wager auditioned for the role of young 'Pip' in the film Great Expectations. Wager won the role and was praised by critics for his performance. He won a Film Daily Critics Award for Best Performance For a Juvenile for his role in the film.

After appearing in Great Expectations, Wager continued working in films and television in England. He often lived with the director Brian Desmond Hurst. In the late 1960s, Wager moved to Sydney, Australia where he continued his career in both film and television but occasionally returned to England for acting jobs. He made his final onscreen appearance in the 1988 Australian television movie The Boardroom. Wager then moved to Bali, Indonesia for health reasons.

Death 
On 23 December 1990, Wager died at age of 58 in Bali. He was given a Balinese funeral and his ashes were scattered at a lake.

Partial filmography
 Great Expectations (1946) – Young Pip
 Hungry Hill (1947) – Young Wild Johnnie
 Fame Is the Spur (1947) – The Boy Hamer
 The Guinea Pig (1948) – Bert
 The Secret Tunnel (1948) – Roger Henderson
 No Place for Jennifer (1950) – Ted
 Scrooge (1951) – Fezziwig's Lad (uncredited)
 Above Us the Waves (1955) – George
 The Battle of the River Plate (1956) – Lookout, HMS Ajax (uncredited)
 The Wind Cannot Read (1958) – Moss
 The Captain's Table (1959) – Tony Millington (uncredited)
 Night of the Prowler (1962) – Det. Sgt. Baker
 Shadow of Fear (1963) – Jack Carter
 The Hi-Jackers (1963) – Smithy
 Be My Guest (1965) – Artie Clough
 Two Left Feet (1965) – Master of Ceremonies (uncredited)
 The Little Ones (1965) – (uncredited)
 Night Caller from Outer Space (1965) – Pvt. Higgins
 Stir (1980) – Visiting Justice
 Daisy and Simon (1989) – Cuthbert (final film role)

References

External links
 
 A Tribute to Anthony Wager by Wager's great nephew and sister

1932 births
1990 deaths
20th-century English male actors
Male actors from London
English expatriates in Australia
English expatriates in Indonesia
English male film actors
English male child actors
English male stage actors
English male television actors
English television writers
Deaths in Indonesia
British male television writers
20th-century English screenwriters